Charles Aurelius Smith (January 22, 1861April 1, 1916) was the 91st governor of South Carolina from January 14 to January 19, 1915. His term of five days stands as the shortest for any governor in South Carolina.

Biography
Born on January 22, 1861, in Hertford County, North Carolina, Smith attended Wake Forest University and graduated in 1882. He moved to Timmonsville, South Carolina, the following year and began pursuing banking and business interests, eventually becoming the president of several banks in South Carolina. In addition, Smith served as president of the South Carolina Baptist Association and was a trustee of Furman University and Greenville Women's College.

Smith was elected to the South Carolina House of Representatives in 1908 and was elected the 67th Lieutenant Governor two years later in 1911. Governor Cole Blease resigned five days before the end of his second term on January 14, 1915. Smith succeeded to the governorship and only performed ceremonial functions during his five days in office.

After serving as governor, Smith moved to Baltimore where he died on April 1, 1916. He was buried at Byrd Cemetery in Timmonsville and a large monument marks his grave.

He and his wife, Fannie L. Byrd, had nine children. Smith was a Baptist.

His home at Timmonsville, the Smith-Cannon House, was listed on the National Register of Historic Places in 1983.

References

1861 births
1916 deaths
People from Hertford County, North Carolina
Baptists from North Carolina
Wake Forest University alumni
Democratic Party members of the South Carolina House of Representatives
Democratic Party governors of South Carolina
Lieutenant Governors of South Carolina
19th-century American politicians
19th-century Baptists
Maryland Democrats